This is a list of augmented reality video games. Most games on this list are mobile games and do not run on AR headsets.

Some games on this list use AR as a passing feature, while others incorporate it as a core part of the gameplay.

AR games do not include Kinect or EyeToy games. Certain gaming devices, such as the EyeToy, PlayStation Eye, Kinect, Nintendo 3DS, PlayStation Portable, PlayStation Vita, Nintendo Switch, and some mobile devices, use cameras to augment computer graphics onto live footage, but they are not augmented reality devices as the view is not first person. The majority of AR software uses special cards which are read by the device to pinpoint where the graphics will form.

Games
 AR Games - a pre-loaded app on the Nintendo 3DS gaming console consisting of numerous AR games.
 Bravely Default - Features an AR Movie Mode which recognises a series of AR Cards to display short augmented reality introductions to the playable cast and more. 
Cybergeneration - a table top role-playing game by R. Talsorian, includes "virtuality", an augmented reality created through v-trodes, cheap, widely available devices people wear at their temples.
 Dead Space - a video game in which a RIG worn by Isaac Clarke is thoroughly equipped with augmented reality technology, including a navigation system that projects a line along the best route to his destination, and a system that displays images, video and text in front of him.  In conjunction with the game, an augmented-reality website called No Known Survivors was released in 2008.
E.X. Troopers - a video game with an AR Mode on the Nintendo 3DS version. This recognises AR Cards of characters to display them as well as numerous emotes and attacks when the player presses inputs.
Fnaf: Special Delivery - a free-to-play spin-off game in the Five Nights at Freddy's franchise, published and developed by Illumix for mobile devices.
Hatsune Miku: Project DIVA F - a video game in which an option named AR Mode allows the console to project Hatsune Miku onto a fiduciary marker. This enables her to sing as an augmented-reality Vocaloid.
Harry Potter: Wizards Unite - a location-based mobile game developed by Niantic Labs for iOS and Android devices.
Hydrophobia - a survival-adventure video game from Dark Energy Digital features the MAVI (Mobile Automated Visual Interface), which is a tool used to enhance environmental geometry among other purposes.
Invizimals - a Spanish PSP and PSVITA exclusive videogame franchise, whose main titles revolved around using augmented reality and special peripherals, to catch the name-shake creatures.
Jurassic World Alive - a free-to-play location-based, augmented reality game developed by Ludia for iOS and Android devices.
 Let's Hunt Monsters - a China-exclusive, free-to-play augmented reality game published by Tencent for iOS and Android.
LyteShot - an open source mobile gaming system that uses sensor-based technology to play digital video games, such as first person shooters, in the live action space. It can also use smartglasses for interactive gameplay.
Mario Kart Live: Home Circuit - videogame for the Nintendo Switch. Allows user to use home setting as a race track. AR is added to deliver elements from the Mario Kart series.
Pokémon Go - a free-to-play location-based, augmented reality game developed by Niantic for iOS and Android devices.
Raving Rabbids: Alive & Kicking By Ubisoft Milan
Spectrek -  an augmented reality ghost hunting game.
Tuttuki Bako - a minigame system from Bandai is described as featuring augmented reality.

See also 
List of augmented reality software

References

 
Augmented reality